Gregory Peter Willows (born 15 February 1999) is an English cricketer. He made his List A debut on 30 June 2019, for Gloucestershire against the Australia A cricket team.

References

External links
 

1999 births
Living people
English cricketers
Gloucestershire cricketers
Sportspeople from Dorchester, Dorset
Cricketers from Dorset
English cricketers of the 21st century